The 1995–96 FIS Cross-Country World Cup  was the 15th official World Cup season in cross-country skiing for men and women. The season began in Vuokatti, Finland, on 25 November 1995 and finished at Holmenkollen, Oslo, Norway, on 16 March 1996. Bjørn Dæhlie of Norway won the combined men's cup, and Manuela Di Centa of Italy won the women's.

Calendar

Men

Women

Men's team

Women's team

Men's overall standings

Women's overall standings

Achievements
Victories in this World Cup (all-time number of victories as of 1995/96 season in parentheses)

Men
 , 6 (30) first places
 , 6 (28) first places
 , 1 (7) first place
 , 1 (1) first place
 , 1 (1) first place
 , 1 (1) first place

Women
 , 7 (15) first places
 , 4 (37) first places
 , 2 (13) first places
 , 1 (8) first place
 , 1 (3) first place
 , 1 (10) first place

References

FIS Cross-Country World Cup seasons
World Cup 1995-96
World Cup 1995-96